Gladwin is an unincorporated community in Tucker County in the U.S. state of West Virginia. It is situated at the point where Glady Fork discharges into Dry Fork of Cheat River.

In 1943 and '44, the U.S. Army taught pack mule techniques at a mule school set up near Gladwin as part of the West Virginia Maneuver Area.

Jim Bonner is the current  mayor of Gladwin.

Unincorporated communities in Tucker County, West Virginia
Unincorporated communities in West Virginia